Mike Lambros (born January 31, 1949) is a retired Canadian football player who played for the Edmonton Eskimos of the Canadian Football League (CFL). He played college football at Queen's University.

References

1949 births
Living people
Edmonton Elks players
Canadian football linebackers
Queen's Golden Gaels football players
Players of Canadian football from Ontario
People from Bruce County